Banarsi is a census town in Raipur District  in the state of Chhattisgarh, India.

Demographics
 India census, Banarsi had a population of 10,648. Males constitute 52% of the population and females 48%. Banarsi has an average literacy rate of 73%, higher than the national average of 59.5%; with 58% of the males and 42% of females literate. 13% of the population is under 6 years of age.

References

Cities and towns in Raipur district